Domenic Keller is a Swiss bobsledder who competed in the early 2000s. He won two bronze medals in the four-man event at the FIBT World Championships earning them in 2000 and 2001.

References
Bobsleigh four-man world championship medalists since 1930

Living people
Year of birth missing (living people)
Swiss male bobsledders
21st-century Swiss people